The Secretary for Social Affairs and Culture is a department of the Macao Government. The Secretariat is responsible for the education, health, tourism, social affairs and culture issues in the region.

The current department took over the role formerly held by the:
 Secretary for Social Affairs and Budget (Portuguese: Secretariado para os Assuntos Sociais e Orçamento)
 Secretary for Communications, Tourism and Culture (Portuguese: Secretariado para as Comunicações, Turismo e Cultura)

Organisational structure 
 Office of the Secretary for Social Affairs and Culture
 Education and Youth Development Bureau
 Cultural Affairs Bureau
 Sports Bureau
 Health Bureau
 Pharmaceutical Administration Bureau
 Social Security Fund
 Cultural Development Fund
 University of Macau
 Macao Polytechnic University
 Macao Institute for Tourism Studies

List of Secretaries

Former Officials
 Dr. Antonio Salavessa da Costa - Secretary for Communications, Tourism and Culture

See also
Other principal officials of Macau:

 Secretary for Administration and Justice
 Secretary for Economy and Finance
 Secretary for Security
 Secretary for Transport and Public Works

References

External links
 Organization Chart of the MSAR

Social Affairs and Culture, Secretariat for
Government departments and agencies of Macau
Political office-holders in Macau
Positions of the Macau Government
Education in Macau
Macau